The Santiago Truck Trail is a scenic trail in the Santa Ana Mountains and is known for mountain biking. It is located in Orange County, California, and is served by Santiago Canyon Road. The nearest urban area is the Portola Hills portion of Lake Forest.

External links
Santiago Truck Trail

Geography of Orange County, California
Santa Ana Mountains
Mountain biking venues in the United States